Color Ocean Road is the eleventh studio album by American electronic musician Vektroid, released on May 13, 2012.

Track listing

References

2012 albums
Vektroid albums